Holiday Lakes is a town in Brazoria County, Texas, United States. The population was 991 at the 2020 census.

Geography

Demographics

As of the 2020 United States census, there were 991 people, 298 households, and 240 families residing in the town.

At the 2000 census there were 1,095 people, 342 households, and 260 families in the town. The population density was 1,124.7 people per square mile (435.9/km). There were 412 housing units at an average density of 423.2 per square mile (164.0/km).  The racial makeup of the town was 73.97% White, 2.65% African American, 1.55% Native American, 18.81% from other races, and 3.01% from two or more races. Hispanic or Latino of any race were 47.21%.

Of the 342 households 45.9% had children under the age of 18 living with them, 60.2% were married couples living together, 7.9% had a female householder with no husband present, and 23.7% were non-families. 18.7% of households were one person and 7.3% were one person aged 65 or older. The average household size was 3.20 and the average family size was 3.71.

The age distribution was 36.6% under the age of 18, 8.5% from 18 to 24, 28.2% from 25 to 44, 19.4% from 45 to 64, and 7.3% 65 or older. The median age was 29 years. For every 100 females, there were 105.8 males. For every 100 females age 18 and over, there were 107.2 males.

The median household income was $33,938 and the median family income  was $34,931. Males had a median income of $29,750 versus $19,750 for females. The per capita income for the town was $12,463. About 12.0% of families and 15.8% of the population were below the poverty line, including 19.3% of those under age 18 and 6.6% of those age 65 or over.

Education
The town is located in Angleton Independent School District, including Angleton High School.

The Texas Legislature designated portions of Angleton ISD that by September 1, 1995 had not been annexed by Alvin Community College as in the Brazosport College zone. As Holiday Lakes is not in the maps of Alvin CC, it is in the Brazosport College zone.

References

External links
Town of Holiday Lakes official website

Towns in Brazoria County, Texas
Towns in Texas
Greater Houston